The Dereham Baronetcy, of West Dereham in the County of Norfolk, was a title in the Baronetage of England. It was created on 8 June 1661 for Thomas Dereham. The fourth Baronet was a Fellow of the Royal Society. The title became extinct on his death in 1739.

Dereham Baronets, of West Dereham (1661)
Sir Thomas Dereham, 1st Baronet (–1668)
Sir Henry Dereham, 2nd Baronet (c. 1643–1682)
Sir Richard Dereham, 3rd Baronet (1644–c. 1710)
Sir Thomas Dereham, 4th Baronet (c. 1678–1739)

References

Extinct baronetcies in the Baronetage of England